Ruti Olajugbagbe (born 20 September 1999) is an English singer-songwriter. After winning the seventh series of The Voice UK, she released her debut EP Racing Cars in 2019.

Career

2018: The Voice UK
In 2018, Olajugbagbe auditioned for The Voice UK, and joined Sir Tom Jones's team. After winning the series, her winner's single "Dreams", a cover of The Cranberries song, reached number 1 on the UK iTunes Store, and debuted at number 14 on the UK Singles Chart.

Performances

2019: Racing Cars 
On 5 April 2019, Olajugbagbe released her debut extended play, Racing Cars, through Polydor. She returned to the final of the eighth series of The Voice to perform the lead single, "Racing Cars". Following the release of the EP, Olajugbagbe announced that she had been dropped from Polydor.

2021: New Record Deal 
In September 2021, Olajugbagbe said that she had signed a Publishing deal with Sony Music Publishing. Two months later in November 2021, Olajugbagbe also announced on her Instagram Page that she had signed a new record deal with PMR Records, part of the Universal Music Group.

Discography

Extended plays

Singles

As solo artist

As featured artist

References

1999 births
Living people
21st-century Black British male singers
English pop singers
Nigerian emigrants to the United Kingdom
The Voice (franchise) winners
The Voice UK contestants
Feminist musicians